Elections to Watford Borough Council were held on 3 May 2012. Three years in every four, a third of the council (12 councillors) retires and elections are held (in the fourth year, elections are held for county councillors).

In this council election, the Labour Party gained two seats from the Liberal Democrats; the Liberal Democrats gained one from the Conservatives. However, the Liberal Democrats remained firmly in control of the council. Four parties, Liberal Democrats, Labour, Conservative and Green, all put up candidates in every seat. There were also three UKIP candidates.

In the year following this election there will not be elections to the Borough Council (apart from by-elections) and Hertfordshire County elections will be held in May 2013. In the years 2010 to 2012, although the Labour Party recovered from its worst position, in 2010, it has only won seats in its three strongest wards and has yet to challenge the Liberal Democrats grip on votes and power. Labour has, however, supplanted the Conservatives as the main opposition party (albeit still 15 seats short of the Liberal Democrats) and the Greens continue to hold their own in Callowland ward, pushing the Conservatives into the smallest party position.

After the election, the composition of the council was:
Liberal Democrat: 23
Labour: 8
Green: 3
Conservative: 2

Council election result

Ward results

References

2012 English local elections
2012
2010s in Hertfordshire